This article shows the rosters of all participating teams at the 2011 FIVB Volleyball Women's World Cup in Japan.

The following is the Algeria roster in the 2011 FIVB World Cup.

The following is the Argentina roster in the 2011 FIVB World Cup.

The following is the Brazil roster in the 2011 FIVB World Cup.

The following is the China roster in the 2011 FIVB World Cup.

The following is the Dominican Republic roster in the 2011 FIVB World Cup.

The following is the Germany roster in the 2011 FIVB World Cup.

The following is the Italy roster in the 2011 FIVB World Cup.

The following is the Japan roster in the 2011 FIVB World Cup.

The following is the Kenya roster in the 2011 FIVB World Cup.

The following is the Serbia roster in the 2011 FIVB World Cup.

The following is the South Korea roster in the 2011 FIVB World Cup.

The following is the United States roster in the 2011 FIVB World Cup.

See also
2011 FIVB Volleyball Men's World Cup squads

References

External links
Official website

F
S
Volleyball qualification for the 2012 Summer Olympics
Vol